Frank L. Smith (June 26, 1851 – October 13, 1926) was an American farmer and politician from New York.

Life 
Smith was born on June 26, 1851, in Charlton, New York. He attended the Charlton Academy.

Smith worked as a farmer in Charlton. He was a member of the Harmony Association, Patrons of Industry, and the Grange. He was as a manager of the Saratoga County Agricultural Society. He served as justice of the peace for eight years and school commissioner for three terms. In the last fifteen years of his life, he was manager of the Galway Telephone Company.

Smith served as town supervisor of Galway. in 1888 and 1889. In 1891, Smith was elected to the New York State Assembly as a Republican, representing the Saratoga County 1st District. He served in the Assembly in 1892.

In 1875, Smith married Mary E. Feeney. She died in 1914. In 1921, he married Achsah Holbrook. He had two daughters, Mrs. William Crawford and Mrs. Clinton Palmatier. He was a member of the Charlton Presbyterian church, and was superintendent of the Sunday school for thirty years.

Smith died on October 13, 1926. He was buried in Pine Grove Cemetery.

References

External links 
The Political Graveyard

1851 births
1926 deaths
People from Charlton, New York
People from Galway, New York
National Grange of the Order of Patrons of Husbandry
American justices of the peace
Town supervisors in New York (state)
Farmers from New York (state)
19th-century American politicians
Republican Party members of the New York State Assembly
Presbyterians from New York (state)
Burials in New York (state)